Ian Le Marquand or Bryan Ian Le Marquand (born 18 September 1951) is a Jersey politician, deputy chief minister, minister for home affairs and a former magistrate.

Education
Le Marquand was educated at Jersey High School, Victoria College Preparatory, Victoria College, and The College of Law.

Legal career
Le Marquand was Jersey's judicial Greffier from 1990 to 1997, and the senior magistrate from 1999 to 2008.

Political career
Le Marquand was first sworn in as a senator for the States of Jersey on 8 December 2008, after topping the polls in the 2008 Jersey general election.

On 25 November 2011, he was appointed as deputy chief minister by the chief minister, Ian Gorst.

See also
Courts of Jersey
Council of Ministers of Jersey

References

External links

Living people
Senators of Jersey
Government ministers of Jersey
Judiciary of Jersey
People educated at Victoria College, Jersey
1951 births
Jersey lawyers